Tyler Nicholson (born August 3, 1995) is a Canadian snowboarder, competing in the disciplines of big air and slopestyle.

Career

X Games
Nicholson took the silver medal in slopestyle at Winter X Games XXI.

2018 Winter Olympics
In January 2018, Nicholson was named to Canada's 2018 Olympic team.

Personal life
Nicholson is engaged to American snowboarder Jamie Anderson.

References

External links
 
 
 
 
 

1995 births
Living people
Canadian male snowboarders
Sportspeople from North Bay, Ontario
Snowboarders at the 2018 Winter Olympics
Olympic snowboarders of Canada
Snowboarders at the 2012 Winter Youth Olympics